Georg Hammer (born 11 December 1950) is a Norwegian footballer. He played in seven matches for the Norway national football team in 1979.

References

External links
 

1950 births
Living people
Norwegian footballers
Norway international footballers
Association football defenders
Sportspeople from Kristiansund
Norway under-21 international footballers
Lillestrøm SK players
Kristiansund BK players
Skeid Fotball players